Hieromantis rectangula is a moth of the Stathmopodidae family. It is found in China (Fujian, Hainan, Zhejiang).

The wingspan is 6−8.5 mm. The forewings are creamy white, with scattered yellowish brown scales, ochreous yellow from the dorsal two-thirds along the dorsum to the apex. There is a trapezoidal ochreous yellow patch extending from between the costal one-third and two-fifths to between the dorsal one-fourth and half. There is an inverted triangular ochreous yellow patch, extending from between the costal three-fifths and four-fifths to the lower angle of the cell, bearing an ill-defined black dot posteriorly, with a narrow silvery grey band placed along its outer margin. The dorsum has an ovate dark blotch located between the basal one-fourth and two-fifths, consisting of tufts of shining purple grey scales, its anterior margin crossing two-fifths the width of the wing. Near its inner side is a black spot. The hindwings are greyish brown.

Etymology
The species name refers to the rectangular juxta in the male genitalia and is derived from Latin rectangulus.

References

Moths described in 2015
Hieromantis